Bala Mahalleh-ye Naser Kiadeh (also Romanized as Bālā Maḩalleh-ye Nāşer Kīādeh; also known as Nāşer Kīādeh) is a village in Shirju Posht Rural District, Rudboneh District, Lahijan County, Gilan Province, Iran. At the 2006 census, its population was 1,019, in 314 families.

References 

Populated places in Lahijan County